Mymensingh Power Station ) is a  210 megawatt gas-fired power station in Mymensingh, Bangladesh.

It is powered by Rural Power company limited Bangladesh

See also
 Rural Electrification Board
 Rural Power Company Limited
 Mymensingh Palli Bidyut Samity-1

References

Power stations in Bangladesh
1994 establishments in Bangladesh
Rural electrification
Energy in Bangladesh